Eois heliadaria is a moth in the  family Geometridae. It is found in Guiana and Honduras.

References

Moths described in 1857
Eois
Moths of Central America
Moths of South America